Syed Shah Afzal Biabani (1795 – 1856 A.D / 1210 – 26 Safar, 1272 AH) was a Sufi from Warangal, Hyderabad State (now Kazipet 132 km from Hyderabad, India). He was appointed as Kazi of Warangal during the reign of Nizam Ali Khan (Asaf Jah II). His dargah is among the pilgrimage centers of Warangal, Telangana.

The word "Biabani" is a plural of Urdu and Persian word "Biaban" which means soonsan (in Urdu) and uninhabited place in English. He received this nickname because he spent 12 years in Tasawwuf (a form of Sufi meditation) in the caves located in the forest of Battupalli near Kazipet.

Saint By Birth
Afzal Biabani was a saint (Vali Allah) by birth. His mother said that there was something extraordinary in him right from the childhood. Some miraculous incidents were manifested even in his childhood. Once at the residence of his brother, Syed Murtuza Hussaini at Qutbi guda, Hyderabad, playing with children of his age (four to five years old) in the courtyard, he dug a small pit (well), like the other children. But to their astonishment water was found in the pit dug by him, whereas the other pits were dry. His maternal uncle said that Afzal Biabani would become a saint and a man of miracles in future by the grace of Allah.

Sainthood

Although he was the Qazi of Warangal district and Jagirdar of Kazipet village, he was averse to the life of a feudal Lord and refused to live in the Haveli. He preferred to live in a hut like any other poor man. His mother objected to it. She was of the opinion that he had to maintain the dignity of his social position. He politely convinced her and made the way clear to reside in a hut. This reflected his desire to break the barriers between the life of the master and a servant. He willingly opted for the dress, the food and lifestyle of a poor man.

Soldiers as disciples 

Haji Mohibullah Khan Saheb from Delhi and Namdar Khan Saheb, a servant in the army at Bolaram in Secunderabad, wished to join the circle Afzal Biabani as disciples. When they went to his hut at Kazipet, they were informed that he was in the hut of a Hindu weaver (Padmashali) who was his immediate neighbour and friend, when they found the great Sufi resting his head on a stone and sleeping on the ground. The eagerness of the Sufi-saint to live closer to the hearts of the people shows nothing except his willingness to share their joys and sorrows as members of one family and thus strengthen the integrated setting of the society.

Serving as an Imam 

Some members of the army contingent stationed at Hanamakonda waited upon the Qazi Saheb Afzal Biabani and requested him to lead them in Eid prayer at Hanamakonda. They brought a horse for his ride. He asked for two more horses for his friends. People were taken aback to see that those friends were the Hindu weavers riding along with him. He wanted to share the joys of Eid with his Hindu neighbours.

Teachings 

Afzal Biabani used to teach his disciples high morals like simplicity, social equality and to serve people irrespective of their caste, creed, language, religion and region. For this reason many people belonging to different religions are devotees and followers.

Thus he proved himself to be a symbol of national integration, communal harmony, social justice and protector of human rights.

Even today, his shrine (Dargah) at Kazipet is much thronged and revered by Muslims, Hindus, Christians and Sikhs alike.

It is observed that most of the Hindu families of Kazipet and neighbouring villages bring the bride and bride-groom to this shrine (Dargah) immediately after the marriage to get the blessings for the newly married couple before they get to their homes.

Family
His father was Syed Shah Ghulam Mohiuddin Biabani and mother Qasim Bibi Saheba. Mir Qurban Ali, the then Collector of Warangal suba was his father-in-law.

Family Tree of Sufi Masters
An indispensable element in Sufi organization is the spiritual master or Murshid, around whom disciples gather and from whom disciples receive the initiation (baiat) which, through a long chain (silsila), is ultimately derived from Mohammad himself. The family tree of Sufi masters, from the earliest times to the present day, is replete with examples of outstanding holiness. The names of these saints have been given to those ‘branches’ of the tree over which their particular radiance shines. These branches are known as turuq (singular tariqa = path), and are indeed so many paths to haqiqa, the inward, divine reality or in other words, to Allah himself.

The first great Sufi order to appear in the form in which turuq are now known was the Qadiri tariqa, which took its name from its illustrious founder, the Shaikh Abdal Qadir al Jilani (1078–1166 A.D.).

Education
Shaha Afzal received primary education from his father, he learned Marifat, Tariqat and Zikar-e-Qalbi from his father and received khilafat (spiritual succession) from him.

He learned Quran and Hadith from the Sufi of Fort Warangal Ht Faqirullah Shah.

Dargah 

His shrine (Dargah) at Kazipet is 2 km from Kazipet Railway Station in Warangal District, which is famous worldwide. People come from all parts of the world and from all religions to attend the urs celebrations every year. These celebrations are held for 3 days beginning on 26, Safar (second month of the Islamic calendar), every year. they are attended by the large masses from India as well from abroad.

References

External links
 Dargah Location

Sufi mystics
Indian Sufi saints
1795 births
1856 deaths